Lope de Vega was a Spanish Golden Age poet and playwright. One of the most prolific writers in history, he was said to have written 2,200 plays (an average of nearly one per week for his entire adult life), though fewer than 400 survive today. In addition, he produced volumes of short and epic poems as well as prose works. For this fecundity, Cervantes nicknamed him the "Monster of Nature". His example crystallized the style of Spanish comedias for generations.

Over 50 English translations of Lope's plays have been published, all but three of them after 1900. As multiple translations of several plays have been made, this covers only about two dozen Spanish originals. By far, the most frequently translated play is Fuente Ovejuna (The Sheep Well), followed by The Dog in the Manger, The Knight of Olmedo, The Silly Lady, Peribáñez and the Comendador of Ocaña, and Capulets and Montagues.

Translations

Key

 Spanish Title — The original comedia or auto that serves as the basis of the English text.
 English Title — The title of the English text, as it appears in the particular translation. Because one Spanish title may suggest alternate English titles (e.g. Fuente Ovejuna, The Sheep Well, All Citizens are Soldiers), sorting by this column is not a reliable way to group all translations of a particular original together; to do so, sort on Spanish Title.
 Year — The year of the translation's first publication. Some translations may have been written or produced earlier than this date, and some were republished subsequently, but this is not noted here.
 Publication — The publication in which the translation first appeared. When the publication consisted only of the single named play this information is not repeated, except in cases where the publication title is used as an external link to the work, or when it is matched with an ISBN.
 Notes — May indicate the style of translation or significant republications; all works are 3-act comedias unless noted.

Table

Related translations
The Star of Seville, previously attributed to Lope but no longer judged to be by him, is not included in this list. Fanny Kemble's five-act 1837  is based on an earlier précis by Lord Holland.

La Dorotea, a genre-bending closet drama or novel in prose dialogue with interspersed poems, is also not included. It was translated by Alan S. Trueblood and Edwin Honig (1985) .

Notes

References

External links
Online bibliography
 A Bibliography Of Spanish Comedias In English Translation
Additional translated texts available online
 AHCT Spanish Comedias in English Translation
 Lope de Vega at Project Gutenberg

17th-century plays
Plays by Lope de Vega
Translations into English
Lists of plays
Translation-related lists